Ken-Marti Vaher (born 5 September 1974) is a leading member of the Estonian Pro Patria and Res Publica Union party.

He has served twice as a Minister: as Minister of Justice (2003–2005) and as Minister of the Interior (2011–2014).

Career
Vaher, born in Tallinn on 5 September 1974, was educated at the University of Tartu, where he received a bachelor's degree in law. A career politician and civil servant Vaher served as Director of the State Audit Office as well as a member of the Tallinn City Council, before being appointed to the Minister of Justice position in the Juhan Parts government.

On 21 March 2005, Vaher received a vote of no confidence from the Riigikogu. The vote followed concerns about the handling of a controversial anti-corruption plan. The plan, as it was proposed, would have established a quota system of how many civil servants had to be prosecuted every year, it was set on a per county basis. Members of the opposition in the Riigikogu considered the programme as draconian. On 24 March 2005, Prime Minister Juhan Parts announced that he would step down from the position of Prime Minister and requested that the President reform the government, in part having to do with Parts' support for the program.

In 2015 parliamentary election, Vaher was re-chosen to the parliament with 2,313 individual votes.

References

External links

Official Riigikogu profile

1974 births
Living people
University of Tartu alumni
Politicians from Tallinn
Justice ministers of Estonia
Members of the Riigikogu, 2003–2007
Members of the Riigikogu, 2007–2011
Members of the Riigikogu, 2011–2015
Members of the Riigikogu, 2015–2019
21st-century Estonian politicians